During the 1993–94 English football season, Everton F.C. competed in the FA Premier League.

Season summary
Everton's reputation as a club living on former glories (in this case glories within the last 10 years) was highlighted this season as they were never out of the relegation battle when just a few seasons before they had been league champions.

Manager Howard Kendall's second spell as manager came to an end – of his own volition – in December just after they ended a seven-match winless run. This was followed by a terrible run of results under the caretaker management of Jimmy Gabriel, leaving Everton just one place outside the relegation zone by the time Kendall's permanent replacement was named.

As the new year dawned, Mike Walker was brought in as Kendall's successor and, after his successful 18-month reign at Norwich City which had seen the Canaries record their highest-ever league placing, there was much optimism that Walker was the man to restore Everton to their former glory. This optimism seemed to be justified as Walker earned 11 points from his first 6 matches in charge, but then followed another awful run of form which, combined with several other struggling sides earning favourable results as the season drew to a close, saw Everton dumped into the relegation zone following the penultimate round of matches.

On the last day of the season, Everton went 2–0 down to Wimbledon and they looked all set for relegation – just seven years earlier they had been league champions. But a dramatic turnaround in the second half saw the Toffees achieve a 3–2 victory (after Hans Segers of Wimbledon dived late to save a soft shot heading for goal) with other matches on which Everton depended also having gone their way, and so they were safe, with the final relegation places going to Sheffield United and Oldham Athletic.

Final league table

Results
Everton's score comes first

Legend

FA Premier League

FA Cup

League Cup

Squad

Left the club during season

References

Everton
Everton F.C. season
Everton F.C. seasons